Jan Vermeer van Haarlem the Elder (1628, Haarlem – 1691, Haarlem), was a Dutch Golden Age landscape painter and the father of Jan Vermeer van Haarlem the Younger.

Biography
According to the RKD he was the grandson of Janneke Knijff (aunt of Wouter Knijff) and was taught by Jacob Willemszoon de Wet. He was the brother of Isaac and the father of Barend and Jan II. He is known for landscapes in the manner of Jacob van Ruisdael.

References

External links
Jan Vermeer van Haarlem on Artnet

1628 births
1691 deaths
Dutch Golden Age painters
Dutch male painters
Dutch landscape painters
Artists from Haarlem